Mahua or Fried Dough Twist is a Chinese dough twist that is fried in peanut oil. It has a shiny and golden look. It is prepared in various ways with different flavors, which range from sweet to spicy, and usually has a dense and crisp texture. The origin of Mahua can be traced back to thousands of years ago. Many places have a tradition of eating Mahua, and Mahua is considered a signature food of the northern Chinese city of Tianjin.

Origin 
According to legend, Mahua originated two thousand years ago. At that time, people celebrated a three-day festival in which they were not allowed to use fire. The lack of access to fire meant that people were unable to cook during the festival. In order to eat, people needed to prepare food that did not spoil easily, before the festival. Thus, the original form of Mahua, which is fried dough with honey, was invented. Because the original Mahua could be kept fresh for a long time, it was a good snack for the festival.

In another tale of the origin of Mahua, Mahua was created to curse the hateful scorpion. At that time, the wild scorpions were bothering people. For revenge, people twisted wheat dough into the shape of the scorpion's tail, then fried and ate it.

Tianjin Guifaxiang 18th Street Mahua 
The most famous Mahua brand is "Guifaxiang 18th Street Fried Dough Twists" from Tianjin, because the shop originated from the 18th Street of the old town. In Tianjin, people normally eat Mahua which have sweet or salty flavor. The most common ingredients used in Tianjin Mahua are flour, sesame, walnut, peanuts and sweet-scented osmanthus.

The Guifaxiang Mahua store was founded on the western side of Tianjin's Haihe River in 1927 by Laoba Liu. The name of "Guifaxiang" implies the meaning of "sweet-scented osmanthus' seeds' aroma, be diligent and be lucky"(桂子飘香，发愤图强，吉祥如意). Because the store is on the 18th Street, the Mahua is called "Guifaxiang 18th Street Mahua". The owner Laoba was a talented baker and he had invented a way to put assorted fillings into the Mahua to improve its appearance and taste. All people loved the snack. gradually, "Guifaxiang 18th street Mahua" had become one of the most famous snacks of Tianjin and it became famous around the country.

The company "Guifaxiang" has built a Museum of Mahua for visitors to learn about the history of Mahua and tour the factory line.

Chen-Mahua in Chongqing 
Chen-Mahua is a kind of Mahua that is famous in Chongqing and has been popular in Chongqing since the Qing Dynasty. It is originated in Ciqikou. Chen-Mahua is normally made in ten flavors, which are original taste, black sesame, pepper salt, black rice, corn, rock sugar glutinous rice, spicy, seaweed, chocolate, and honey. The spicy flavor Mahua is a signature Mahua of Chongqing.

Mahua in Panama 
The snack is extremely popular in Panama, where it has been adopted as a national dish and is referred to as mafá. It was brought over by Chinese immigrants during the nineteenth century.

There is also a savory variant which is green and gets its flavor and color from powdered algae.

See also
 Twisted doughnut
 List of doughnut varieties
 List of fried dough varieties

References

External links

 Ma Hua 
 

Chinese doughnuts
Chinese desserts